is a turn-based strategy role-playing video game for the PlayStation 2.  The game was developed by Vanpool and published by Enterbrain exclusively in Japan on June 27, 2002. The title Coloball is short for "Colosseum Ball," and although the game is touted as a sports adventure game, it is most similar to an RPG board game.

References

External links
 
Coloball 2002 at Enterbrain.co.jp 

2002 video games
Japan-exclusive video games
PlayStation 2 games
PlayStation 2-only games
Role-playing video games
Turn-based strategy video games
Video games developed in Japan

Vanpool games
Single-player video games